Super Girl is the first extended play (EP) and second overall release by South Korean Mandopop boy band Super Junior-M, sub-group of Super Junior. It was released by SM Entertainment on 23 September 2009. It was released in Taiwan on the same day by Avex Taiwan and in Hong Kong on 25 September by Avex Asia and also in Mainland China. It was the last Super Junior-M album to feature Hangeng due to his lawsuit the same year.

The album features five tracks in Mandarin, with high-tempo dance track "Super Girl", written by Yoo Young-jin, as the first lead single and ballad "到了明天" (Blue Tomorrow) as second lead track. A deluxe version B was released on 18 December 2009 in Taiwan and Hong Kong with two bonus tracks of Korean version of "Super Girl" and "到了明天" (Blue Tomorrow), plus a DVD with three music videos and behind-the-scenes footage.

Background
In July 2009, shortly after promotions concluded for Super Junior's third studio album Sorry, Sorry, several members of Super Junior-M wrote on their blogs that recordings of a new album for the subgroup has started, and that a few songs were already finished. Members Zhou Mi and Henry were seen returning to Seoul to participate in the recording.

Reception
The album debuted at number one on Taiwan's G-Music Weekly Top 20 Mandarin and Combo Charts; and Five Music Mandarin Chart for the week of 18 to 24 September 2009, after three days of release. The track "Super Girl" is listed at number 29 on Hit Fm Taiwan's Hit Fm Annual Top 100 Singles Chart for 2009.

In 2010, the group was nominated for Best Vocal Group at 21st Golden Melody Awards, Taiwan for their work on this album.

Track listing

Music videos 
Three music videos were produced in support of the album: "Super Girl" in Chinese and Korean version; and "到了明天" (Blue Tomorrow).

The music video for "Super Girl" was directed by Cho Soo-Hyun and filmed in a studio in Yangsu-ri, Gyeonggi-do, South Korea in August 2009. On 11 September, a 32-second teaser video of it was released throughout Asia, and the full version was released on 14 September on Super Junior's official YouTube channel, China's Sohu news portal, Taiwan's Avex Taiwan homepage and Thailand's GMM website.

The music video of "Super Girl", includes intercut sequences of choreographed dancing by Super Junior-M and that of a nerd (played by Han Geng) who accidentally crashes into a house party. Warmly welcomed by the DJ and others, Han begins taking random pictures of the people in the party with his cell phone. He comes upon a beautiful girl (Jessica of Girls' Generation), and begins taking photos of her. Annoyed, Jessica pushes him away with a disgusted look. Rejected and hurt, Han leaves. Wanting to catch Jessica's attention one more time, he changes into a suitable party boy attire and confidently walks back into the party, surprising Jessica with his new appearance, and wins her into dancing with him.

The music video for "到了明天" (Blue Tomorrow) was released on 7 November 2009. It features the seven Super Junior-M members sitting in a gray space in sad positions and in some scenes are shown singing the song in an empty white space that later has snows falling in the background. The theme of the video deals with a recent broken-up in a relationship. It also includes scenes with colourful objects, e.g. roses and what appears to be love notes with hearts, used for symbolizing a happy relationship being tossed in a fire.

Release history

Charts

Award and nominations

References

External links
 Super Junior-M Avex Taiwan homepage 
 Super Junior official YouTube channel
 Super Girl teaser site

Super Junior-M albums
SM Entertainment EPs
Mandopop EPs
2009 EPs